Dr Herman Shaw (1892 – 4 May 1950) was a British geophysicist who was Director of the Science Museum in London, England.

He was a founder member of the British Society for the History of Science in 1947.

Books 
 Applied Geophysics, H.M.S.O. for the Science Museum             (London), 3rd edition, 1938.

References 

1892 births
1950 deaths
British geophysicists
Directors of the Science Museum, London